The Tesseract, is a 2003 thriller film directed by Oxide Pang and starring Jonathan Rhys-Meyers. It is based on the 1998 novel of the same name by Alex Garland.

The film examines four seemingly unconnected lives brought together through a theft in a Bangkok hotel room (unlike the novel which is set in Manila). The interactions of an English drug dealer, an English psychologist, a Thai assassin, and an abused 13-year-old boy demonstrate that life is so complex that even the smallest events can have enormous, even fatal consequences (i.e. the butterfly effect).

Plot
Sean, a runner for a drug gang, has checked into room 303 at the seedy, rundown Heaven Hotel in Bangkok, to await arrival of a package of heroin. Another guest is Rosa, psychologist who is researching slum children, on the floor below (room 202). In the next room, 203, is Lita, a female assassin who is waiting to intercept the package Sean is waiting for. Tying them all together, is the 13-year-old bellboy, Wit, a streetwise, light-fingered kid.

Cast
 Jonathan Rhys Meyers as Sean
 Saskia Reeves as Rosa
 Alexander Rendell as Wit
 Carlo Nanni as Roy
 Lena Christenchen as Lita

External links

 

2003 films
2003 crime thriller films
2003 psychological thriller films
Films based on British novels
Films directed by Oxide Pang
Japanese thriller films
Thai thriller films
British thriller films
Thai-language films
Films set in Bangkok
2000s English-language films
2000s British films
2000s Japanese films